Coilodera penicillata is a species of beetles belonging to the family Scarabaeidae, subfamily Cetoniinae.

Subspecies
Coilodera penicillata formosana (Moser, 1910) 
Coilodera penicillata nigroscutellaris (Moser, 1901) 
Coilodera penicillata penicillata (Hope, 1831)

Description

Distribution
This species can be found in China, India, Thailand, Laos and Vietnam.

References
  Biolib
 Discover Life
 Bai-du
 Club.it.sohu

Cetoniinae
Beetles described in 1831